Vladimir Vukajlović (Serbian Cyrillic: Владимир Вукајловић; born 25 August 1983) is a Serbian former professional footballer who played as a midfielder.

External links
 

Association football midfielders
Diagoras F.C. players
Expatriate footballers in Greece
Expatriate footballers in Kazakhstan
Expatriate footballers in Slovakia
FC Aktobe players
FK Bežanija players
FK Borac Čačak players
FK Partizan players
FK Rad players
FK Senica players
FK Sloboda Užice players
FK Teleoptik players
FK Vojvodina players
Football League (Greece) players
Kazakhstan Premier League players
Serbia and Montenegro under-21 international footballers
Serbian expatriate footballers
Serbian expatriate sportspeople in Greece
Serbian expatriate sportspeople in Kazakhstan
Serbian expatriate sportspeople in Slovakia
Serbian First League players
Serbian footballers
Serbian SuperLiga players
Slovak Super Liga players
Sportspeople from Čačak
1983 births
Living people